{{Infobox settlement
| name                    = Branná
| other_name              = 
| settlement_type         = Municipality

| image_skyline           = Goldenstein - Fojtství.jpg
| image_caption           = Advocatus seat
| image_flag              = Vlajka obce Branná.gif
| image_shield            = Branná_znak.png

| subdivision_type        = Country
| subdivision_name        = 
| subdivision_type1       = Region
| subdivision_name1       = Olomouc
| subdivision_type2       = District
| subdivision_name2       = Šumperk

| image_map               = 
| map_caption             = 
| pushpin_map             = Czech Republic
| pushpin_relief          = 1
| pushpin_map_caption     = Location in the Czech Republic
| coordinates             = 
| coordinates_footnotes   = 

| leader_title            = 
| leader_name             = 

| established_title       = First mentioned
| established_date        = 1325

| area_footnotes          = 
| area_total_km2          = 14.56

| elevation_footnotes     = 
| elevation_m             = 633

| population_as_of        = 2022-01-01
| population_footnotes    = 
| population_total        = 269
| population_density_km2  = auto

| timezone1               = CET
| utc_offset1             = +1
| timezone1_DST           = CEST
| utc_offset1_DST         = +2

| postal_code_type        = Postal codes
| postal_code             = 788 25
| area_code_type          = 
| area_code               = 

| website                 = 
| footnotes               = 
}}Branná (until 1949 Kolštejn''') is a municipality and village in Šumperk District in the Olomouc Region of the Czech Republic. It has about 300 inhabitants. The historic town centre is well preserved and is protected by law as an urban monument zone.

Geography
It lies in the northern part of the Hanušovice Highlands. The village of Branná is located on a rocky cliff above the Branná River. 

History
Branná (that time known under the name Goldenstein/Kolštejn) was founded around 1282 as a settlement on an old trade route to Silesia. The first written mention of the Kolštejn Castle is from 1325. The castle was probably built in 1308–1310.

After the Battle of White Mountain, Kolštejn was confiscated from its owners and acquired by the House of Liechtenstein. During their rule, the town and the castle lost their importance. In 1918, the municipality acquired the castle.

From 1938 to 1945, Branná was annexed by Nazi Germany and administered as part of the Reichsgau Sudetenland.

Sights

The complex of the Kolštejn Castle and Kolštejn Chateau is the main landmark. The castle complex gained its today's appearance in the 15th century, when extensive fortifications were built, and in the early 17th century, when Renaissance chateau buildings and the entrance tower were built. Today the castle complex is in private ownership. The Gothic castle is a ruin open to the public, and the chateau serves as a hotel with restaurant.

The Advocatus''' seat is a historic monument from the late 16th century. The Church of Saint Michael the Archangel comes from 1612–1614.

References

External links

Villages in Šumperk District